= Wasigny–Renneville/Berlise railway =

Railway line in France

Coordinates: 49.62361°N 4.34826°E

Wasigny–Renneville/Berlise
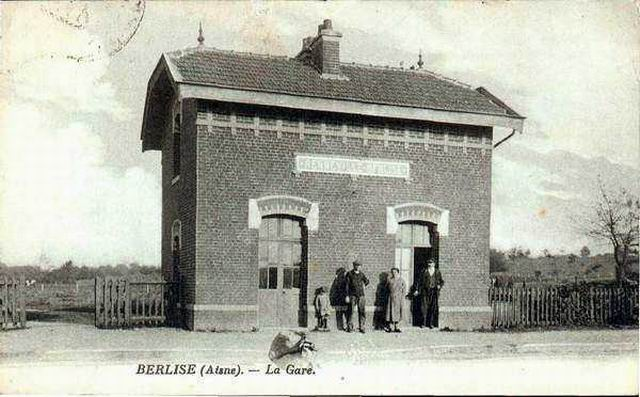
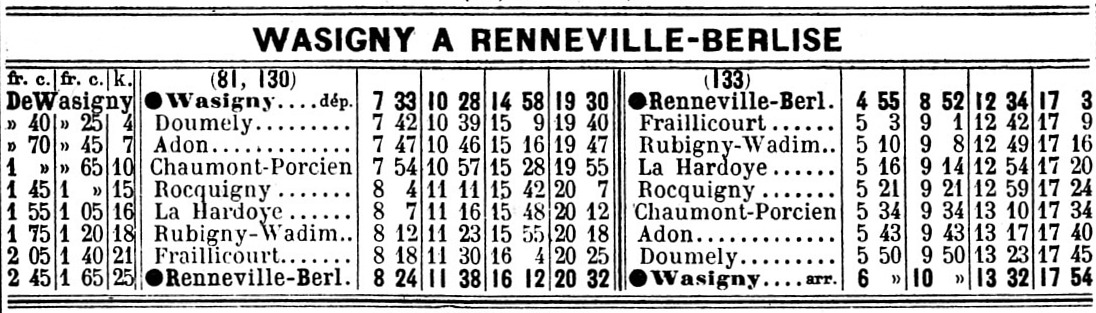
- Berlise Timetable, May 1914

Technical
- Line length: 25 km (16 mi)
- Track gauge: 1,000 mm (3 ft 3 3/8 in)

The Wasigny–Renneville/Berlise railway was a 25 kilometres (16 miles) long metre gauge railway in the north of France, which was commissioned in 1909 and operated until 1948.

== History ==
The secondary railway line of the Chemins de fer départementaux des Ardennes ran from Wasigny to Renneville/Berlise with a gauge of 1000 mm. A 1 km section of the line was in the département of Aisne. The railway was opened in 1909 and operated until 1948.

== Stations ==
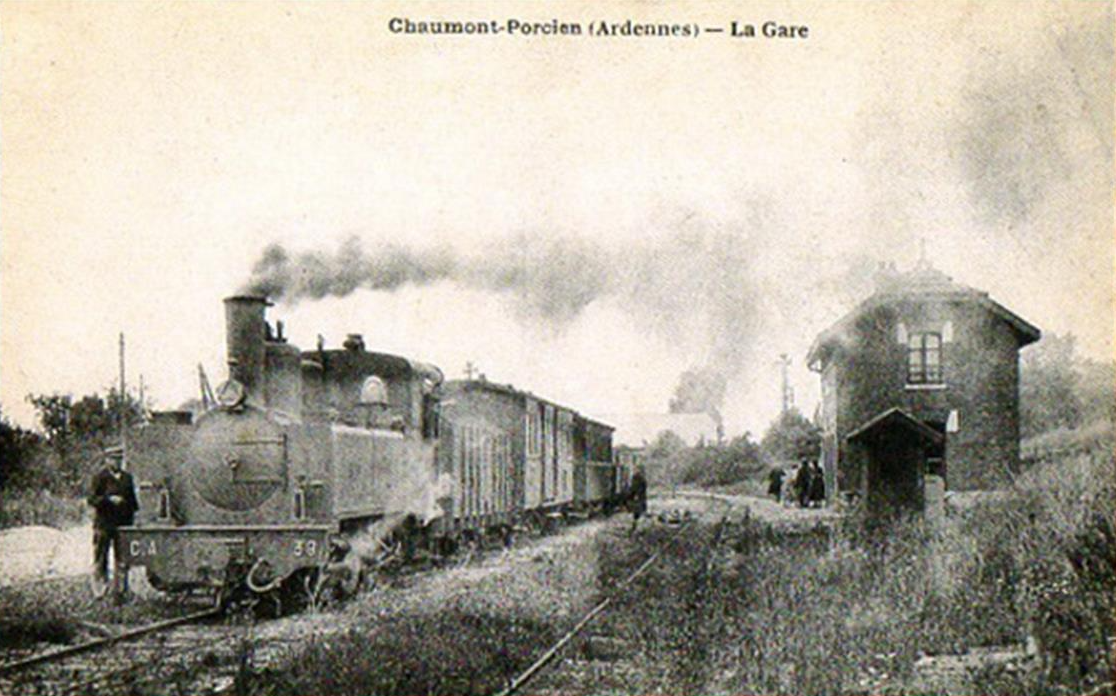
Chaumont-Porcien

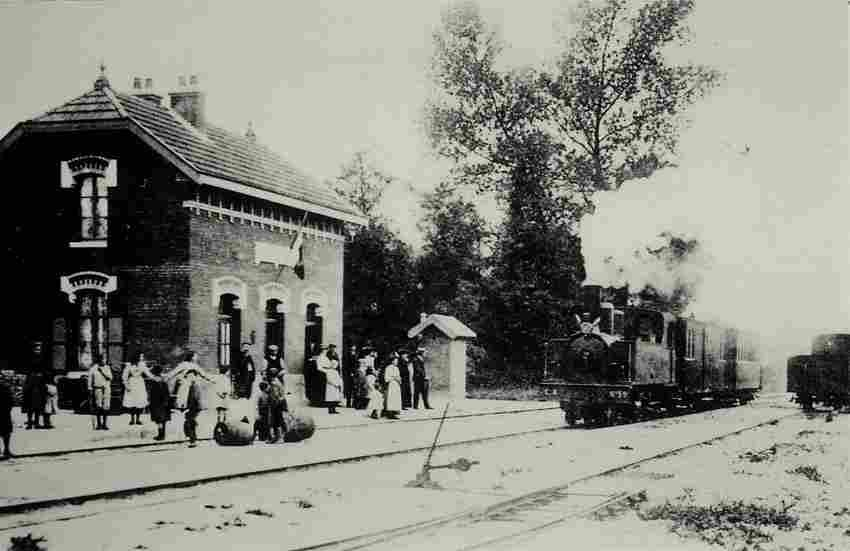
Rocquigny
